Hematopoietic growth factor is a group of glycoproteins that causes blood cells to grow and mature (Haematopoiesis).
"A group of at least seven substances involved in the production of blood cells, including several interleukins and erythropoietin."

External links 
 Hematopoietic growth factor entry in the public domain NCI Dictionary of Cancer Terms

References 

Blood cells
Growth factors